Alfred Deakin Brookes (11 April 1920 – 19 June 2005) was the first head of the Australian Secret Intelligence Service, the intelligence agency of the Australian government that collects foreign intelligence.  He was appointed in 1952 by Robert Menzies the prime minister at that time.

Early life
Brookes was the youngest son of Ivy (née Deakin) and Herbert Brookes. His father was a prominent businessman and philanthropist, while his mother was the daughter of Alfred Deakin, the second Prime Minister of Australia. He had two older siblings, Jessie and Wilfred. Between 1929 and 1930 he lived with his family in Washington as his father was the Commissioner-General to the United States.

Military and intelligence career
During World War II, Brookes enlisted with the army in Melbourne with service number VX112158. He was a  Lieutenant in the Australian Army, and worked at the Allied Intelligence Bureau in Melbourne.  He was the Chief of the Army section in the Far Eastern Liaison Office, which was also known as the Military Propaganda Section or section D.

Brookes lobbied the Menzies government to set up an intelligence organisation in Australia similar to MI6 (the Secret Intelligence Service in the United Kingdom). Richard Casey — the Minister for External Affairs — agreed, and Brookes became the first Director-General of the Australian Secret Intelligence Service until 1957 when he departed public office to work in the private sector.

Later career and interests
He established the Pacific Institute, a discussion forum that brought together representatives from government, business and academia. He was also founding Chairman of the British security company Control Risks Pacific.

Honours
Brookes maintained and promoted  links to Chile and was recognised with the Gran Official of Bernado O'Higgins, the highest award to a non-Chilean.

He named a street "Brookes Street" in Point Lonsdale, Victoria, when he subdivided land which had belonged to his father, Herbert Brookes, into a housing estate.

References

Brian Toohey and William Pinwill, Oyster: The story of the Australian Secret Intelligence Service 1989

Australian people of English descent
1920 births
2005 deaths
Directors-General of the Australian Secret Intelligence Service
Australian Army officers
Australian expatriates in the United States
Australian Army personnel of World War II